Glenn Julian Pennyfather (born 11 February 1963) is an English retired footballer who played as a defender or midfielder. He made 315 appearances in the Football League for Southend United, Crystal Palace. Ipswich Town and Bristol City before moving into non-league football with Stevenage Borough and Canvey Island.

He is a former manager of Chelmsford City, becoming manager after being coach of the club, when he worked alongside long-time friend Jeff King after the pair had joined from a similar arrangement at Canvey Island.

He left the club on 7 May 2013, after a decision was made to not renew his contract. His departure followed Chelmsford's Conference South playoff semi-final defeat to Salisbury City just days before.

Pennyfather is often a summariser for BBC Essex's local football commentaries.

References

External links
 Since 1888... The Searchable Premiership and Football League Player Database (subscription required)
 Pride of Anglia
 

1963 births
Living people
English footballers
Association football defenders
Association football midfielders
Association football utility players
Southend United F.C. players
Crystal Palace F.C. players
Ipswich Town F.C. players
Bristol City F.C. players
Stevenage F.C. players
Premier League players
English football managers
National League (English football) managers
Chelmsford City F.C. managers
People from Billericay
Sportspeople from Essex
Chelmsford City F.C. non-playing staff
Association football coaches